Montgomery County is  a county in the Commonwealth of Pennsylvania. It is the third-most populous county in Pennsylvania and the 73rd-most populous county in the United States. As of the 2020 census, the population of the county was 856,553, representing a 7.1% increase from the 799,884 residents counted in the 2010 census. Montgomery County is located adjacent to and northwest of Philadelphia. The county seat and largest city is Norristown. Montgomery County is geographically diverse, ranging from farms and open land in the extreme north of the county to densely populated suburban neighborhoods in the southern and central portions of the county.

Montgomery County is included in the Philadelphia-Camden-Wilmington PA-NJ-DE-MD metropolitan statistical area, sometimes expansively known as the Delaware Valley. The county marks part of the Delaware Valley's northern border with the Lehigh Valley region of Pennsylvania. In 2010, Montgomery County was the 66th-wealthiest county in the country by median household income. The county borders Philadelphia, the nation's sixth-largest city, to its southeast.

The county was created on September 10, 1784, out of land originally part of Philadelphia County. The first courthouse was housed in the Barley Sheaf Inn. It is believed to have been named either for Richard Montgomery, an American Revolutionary War general killed in 1775 while attempting to capture Quebec City, or for the Welsh county of Montgomeryshire, which was named after one of William the Conqueror's main counselors, Roger de Montgomerie since it was part of the Welsh Tract, an area of Pennsylvania settled by Quakers from Wales. Early histories of the county indicate the origin of the county's name as uncertain.

Geography

Major roads and highways

Adjacent counties
Lehigh County (north)
Bucks County (northeast)
Philadelphia County (southeast)
Delaware County (southwest)
Chester County (west)
Berks County (northwest)

National protected area
Valley Forge National Historical Park (part)

County Owned Parks

Demographics

2020 census
As of the 2020 census, the county was 73.27% White (72.18% White, non-Hispanic), 9.55% Black or African American, 0.22% Native American or Alaskan Native, 7.94% Asian, 0.02% Pacific Islander, and 2.87% some other race; 6.13% were two or more races. 6.36% of the population were Hispanic or Latino of any race.

The largest townships/boroughs in Montgomery County include:

Politics

|}

As of December 27, 2022, there are 597,648 registered voters in Montgomery County.

 Democratic: 300,012 (50.19%)
 Republican: 202,672 (33.91%)
 Independent: 63,685 (10.65%)
 Third Party: 31,279 (5.23%)

Historically, Montgomery County was a stronghold for the Republican Party.  The county was the only one carried by Barbara Hafer in the 1990 gubernatorial election over the incumbent governor, Bob Casey. However, the Democratic Party has made substantial gains in the county over the last quarter-century and gained the registration edge early in 2008.

As in most of Philadelphia's suburbs, the brand of Republicanism practiced in Montgomery County for much of the 20th century was a moderate one. As the national parties have polarized, the county's voters have increasingly supported Democrats at the national level.  After voting for the Republican presidential nominee in all but one election from 1952 to 1988, Lyndon Johnson's landslide in 1964, Montgomery County residents have voted for the Democratic presidential nominee for the past seven consecutive elections, with the margins progressively increasing between 1992 and 2008 to 21.8%. The Democratic victory margin decreased in 2012 back to 14.3%, but rebounded in 2016 to 21.3%. In 2020's election, the Democratic victory margin grew to 26.2%.

Most county-level offices were held by Republicans until after the 2007 election, when Democrats picked up control of five row offices.  Democrats have also won several elections in the Pennsylvania General Assembly in recent years, including two GOP-leaning State House districts in 2004, the 148th with Mike Gerber and the 153rd with Josh Shapiro.  Today, although the county is very Democratic at the national level, at the state and local level, it is not specifically partisan.

In the 2004 United States Senate election, Republican Arlen Specter won the county over Montco resident Joe Hoeffel, but Democrat Bob Casey, Jr. out-polled Rick Santorum in the 2006 Senate election. In 2006, Democrat Rick Taylor unseated incumbent Republican Eugene McGill in the 151st (although Taylor lost in 2010 to Republican Todd Stephens) and, in 2008, Democrat Matthew Bradford unseated incumbent Republican Jay Moyer in the 70th. Six of the county's 12 state house seats and four of the county's eight senate seats are now held by Democrats. All four statewide Democratic candidates carried Montgomery in 2008, with Barack Obama receiving 60% of the county's vote. Barack Obama won Montgomery County in 2008 and 2012.

Despite Donald Trump's victory in the state of Pennsylvania in the 2016 election, Montgomery County was one of the few counties in Pennsylvania which swung in the Democratic presidential candidates' direction with Hillary Clinton winning Montgomery County with 58.87% of the vote, an improvement from Barack Obama's 56.6% vote share in 2012. In the 2016 U.S. Senate elections as well as the Pennsylvania Attorney General elections, Montgomery County voted for Katie McGinty and Josh Shapiro, both Democrats. In 2020, Joe Biden received over 60% of the vote in Montgomery County, the first Democrat to do so in the county's history.

Government
Montgomery County is governed by a three-person county commission.  The current composition is two Democrats and one Republican.  By law, the county commission must have one member of a minority party represented.

County commissioners

County row offices
As of the November 2019 election:

Same-sex marriage
On July 24, 2013, Montgomery County Register of Wills D. Bruce Hanes, a Democrat, announced he would begin issuing marriage licenses to same-sex couples, flouting Pennsylvania law banning such unions. Hanes called the commonwealth's ban "arbitrary and suspect", saying he believes it violates the Pennsylvania Constitution and the United States Constitution. The Republican administration of Governor Tom Corbett filed suit in the Commonwealth Court of Pennsylvania in an attempt to block Hanes from licensing same-sex marriage. Commonwealth Court Judge Dan Pellegrini ordered Hanes in September 2013 to stop issuing same-sex marriage licenses. After Federal Judge John Jones threw out Pennsylvania's ban on same-sex marriage in May 2014, calling it unconstitutional, offices in other counties were able to issue these licenses, while Hanes had to wait for the ruling against him to be removed.

United States Senate

United States House of Representatives

State Senate

State House of Representatives

Economy

Montgomery County is a suburb of Philadelphia, the nation's sixth most populous city, and many of its residents work in the city. However, Montco is also a major employment center with large business parks in Blue Bell, Lansdale, Fort Washington, Horsham, and King of Prussia which attract thousands of workers from all over the region. The strong job base and taxes generated by those jobs have resulted in Montgomery County receiving the highest credit rating of 'AAA' from Standard & Poor's, one of fewer than 30 counties in the United States with such a rating. In 2012, Moody's downgraded the general obligation rating to Aa1, and in 2018 the rating was revised back to Aaa.

Major employers include:

Abington School District
ABM Industries
ACTS Retirement-Life Communities
Aetna
Arcadia University
Giant
GlaxoSmithKline
Hatfield Quality Meats
Hatboro-Horsham School District
Holy Redeemer Health System 
Janssen
Jefferson Abington Hospital
Lockheed Martin
Lower Merion School District
King of Prussia mall
Main Line Health
McNeil Consumer Healthcare
Merck
Montgomery County Community College
Motorola Mobility
Norristown Area School District
North Penn School District
Pfizer
Prudential
Quaker Chemical
Quest Diagnostics
SEI Investments Company
Souderton Area School District
Spring-Ford Area School District

Education

Colleges and universities

Arcadia University
Bryn Athyn College
Bryn Mawr College
DeVry University – Fort Washington
Gwynedd Mercy University
Haverford College
Manor College
Montgomery County Community College
Pennsylvania College of Optometry (Salus University)
Penn State Abington – a commonwealth campus of Pennsylvania State University
Reconstructionist Rabbinical College
Rosemont College
St. Charles Borromeo Seminary
Saint Joseph's University
Temple University – Ambler
Ursinus College
Westminster Theological Seminary

Public school districts

School districts:

Abington School District
Boyertown Area School District
Cheltenham Township School District
Colonial School District
Hatboro-Horsham School District
Jenkintown School District
Lower Merion School District
Lower Moreland Township School District
Methacton School District
Norristown Area School District
North Penn School District
Perkiomen Valley School District
Pottsgrove School District
Pottstown School District
Souderton Area School District
Springfield Township School District
Spring-Ford Area School District
Upper Dublin School District
Upper Merion Area School District
Upper Moreland School District
Upper Perkiomen School District
Wissahickon School District
Bryn Athyn School District – exists as an entity, but does not operate any schools.  Public school students attend class in neighboring districts.

Private secondary schools

Academy Of The New Church Boys School
Academy Of The New Church Girls School
Abington Friends School
The Baldwin School
AIM Academy
Jack M. Barrack Hebrew Academy, formerly known as the Akiba Hebrew Academy
Bishop McDevitt High School
Calvary Baptist School
Coventry Christian Schools
Dock Mennonite Academy
Friends' Central School
Germantown Academy
Gwynedd Mercy Academy High School
Haverford School
The Hill School
Huntingdon Valley Christian Academy
Indian Creek Mennonite School
Lakeside School
Lansdale Catholic High School
La Salle College High School
Lincoln Academy
Main Line Academy
Martin Luther School
Mary, Mother of the Redeemer Catholic School
Meadowbrook School
Merion Mercy Academy
Mount Saint Joseph Academy
New Life Youth & Family Svcs
The Pathway School
The Perkiomen School
Phil-Mont Christian Academy
Pope John Paul II Catholic High School, replaced Kennedy-Kenrick Catholic High School and Saint Pius X High School in 2010.
Reformation Christian School
Saint Aloysius School
Saint Basil Academy
Saint Katherine Day School
Stowe Lighthouse Christ Academy
The Shipley School
Torah Academy of Greater Philadelphia
Trinity Christian Academy
Valley Christian School at Huntingdon Valley Presbyterian Church
Valley Forge Baptist Academy
Wordsworth Academy
Wyncote Academy

Night schools/adult education
Abington Township Adult School
Cheltenham Township Adult School

Communities

Under Pennsylvania law, five types of incorporated municipalities are listed: cities, boroughs, townships, home rule municipalities (which can include communities that bear the name "Borough" or "Township") and, in at most two cases, towns. These boroughs, townships, and home rule municipalities are located in Montgomery County:

Home rule municipalities
 Bryn Athyn (official name remains "Borough of Bryn Athyn")
 Cheltenham Township
 Horsham Township
 Norristown (county seat)
 Plymouth Township
 Whitemarsh Township

Boroughs

Ambler
Bridgeport
Bryn Athyn
Collegeville
Conshohocken
East Greenville
Green Lane
Hatboro
Hatfield
Jenkintown
Lansdale
Narberth
Norristown
North Wales
Pennsburg
Pottstown
Red Hill
Rockledge
Royersford
Schwenksville
Souderton
Telford (lies partly in Bucks County)
Trappe
West Conshohocken

Townships

Abington
Cheltenham
Douglass
East Norriton
Franconia
Hatfield
Horsham
Limerick
Lower Frederick
Lower Gwynedd
Lower Merion
Lower Moreland
Lower Pottsgrove
Lower Providence
Lower Salford
Marlborough
Montgomery
New Hanover
Perkiomen
Plymouth
Salford
Skippack
Springfield
Towamencin
Upper Dublin
Upper Frederick
Upper Gwynedd
Upper Hanover
Upper Merion
Upper Moreland
Upper Pottsgrove
Upper Providence
Upper Salford
West Norriton
West Pottsgrove
Whitemarsh
Whitpain
Worcester

Census-designated places
Census-designated places are geographical areas designated by the United States Census Bureau for the purposes of compiling demographic data. They are not actual jurisdictions under Pennsylvania law. Other unincorporated communities, such as villages, may be listed here, as well.

Arcadia University
Ardmore
Audubon
Blue Bell
Bryn Mawr
Eagleville
Evansburg
Flourtown
Fort Washington
Gilbertsville
Glenside
Halfway House
Harleysville
Haverford College
Horsham
King of Prussia
Kulpsville
Maple Glen
Montgomeryville
Oreland
Penn Wynne
Plymouth Meeting
Pottsgrove
Sanatoga
Skippack
Spring House
Spring Mount
Stowe
Trooper
Willow Grove
Woxall
Wyncote
Wyndmoor

Even though the historic village of Valley Forge, as well as the park, are partially located within Montgomery County, the modern village is in Chester County, PA

Unincorporated communities

Ardsley
Bala Cynwyd
Bethayres
Dresher
Elkins Park
Frederick, a village in New Hanover Township.
Graterford
Gladwyne
Gwynedd
Gwynedd Valley
Huntingdon Valley (small sections in Bucks County)
Lafayette Hill
Lederach
Linfield
Meadowbrook
Melrose Park
Merion Station
Mont Clare
Oaks
Port Providence
Rosemont
Villanova (partly in Delaware County)
Wynnewood (partly in Delaware County)

Population ranking
The population ranking of the following table is based on the 2010 census of Montgomery County.

† county seat

Culture
The Institutes for the Achievement of Human Potential (IAHP), a nonprofit organization founded by Glenn Doman, was established in Wyndmoor in 1955. The IAHP is an educational organization that teaches parents about child brain development, and is a treatment center for brain-injured children.
The Old York Road Symphony, based in Abington, is one of the oldest all-volunteer orchestras in the country, founded in 1932.

Climate
The county has a hot-summer humid continental climate (Dfa) except in some lowland areas very close to Philadelphia where it is humid subtropical (Cfa).  The hardiness zones are 6b and 7a.

See also

 National Register of Historic Places listings in Montgomery County, Pennsylvania

References

External links

 
 Valley Forge & Montgomery County Convention & Visitors Bureau

 
1784 establishments in Pennsylvania
Populated places established in 1784